Dakshin Haryana Bijli Vitran Nigam, also known as DHBVN is an Indian state-owned power distribution utility company. It is owned by Government of Haryana and its headquarter is located in Hisar city of Haryana, India. It has two Operation Zones namely Hisar and Delhi. Each zone is headed by Chief Engineer. Both Zones have Operation circles namely Hisar, Sirsa, Fatehabad, Jind and Bhiwani in Hisar Zone and Gurugram-I, Gurgugram-II, Faridabad, Palwal, Rewari and Narnaul in Delhi Zone. Each circle is headed by Superintending Engineer.

History
In 1998, Haryana State Electricity Board was divided into two parts, namely, Haryana Power Generation Corporation (HPGCL) and Haryana Vidyut Prasaran Nigam (HVPNL). On 1 July 1999, HVPNL was further divided into two parts, namely, Uttar Haryana Bijli Vitran Nigam (UHBVN) and Dakshin Haryana Bijli Vitran Nigam (DHBVN). DHBVN is responsible for distribution of power in South Haryana whether UHBVN is responsible for distribution of power in North Haryana.

Jurisdiction
DHBVN is responsible for distribution of power in the following 12 districts of Haryana:
 Bhiwani
 Faridabad
 Fatehabad
 Gurgaon
 Hisar
 Mewat
 Mahendragarh
 Rewari
 Sirsa
 Jind
 Charkhi Dadri
 Palwal

See also 

 Divisions of Haryana

References

External links
 Official website of DHBVN
 e-payment link of DHBVN
Official portal of Government of Haryana
 HarSamadhan Haryana Govt's online Complaints portal

Energy in Haryana
Government agencies established in 1999
State agencies of Haryana
Electric power distribution network operators in India
State electricity agencies of India
1999 establishments in Haryana